Gondomar is a municipality in Galicia, Spain in the province of Pontevedra. Home of Don Diego Sarmiento de Acuña, conde de Gondomar, one of the most renowned diplomats of Spanish imperial times, the main instigator of the "Spanish Match" that would have joined Charles I of England and the Infanta Maria Anna in marriage.

Gallery

References

Municipalities in the Province of Pontevedra